R12 may refer to:

Automobiles 
 BMW R12, a motorcycle
 Renault 12, a French family car

Aviation 
 Bell R-12, an American utility helicopter
 Caudron R.12, a French experimental biplane
 Republic XR-12 Rainbow, an American experimental reconnaissance aircraft
 R-12 Kassel/Rothwesten, a former United States Army Air Corps airfield in Germany
 Rubik R-12 Kevély, a Hungarian training glider
 Yakovlev R-12, a Soviet prototype reconnaissance aircraft

Roads 
 R12 road (Belgium)
 R12 road (Ghana)
 R-12 regional road (Montenegro)
 R12 road (Russia)

Public transport 
 R12 (New York City Subway car)
 R12 (Rodalies de Catalunya), a regional rail line in Catalonia, Spain
 Kenilworth Avenue Line of the Washington Metropolitan Area Transit Authority

Vessels 
 , a destroyer of the Royal Navy
 , an aircraft carrier of the Royal Navy
 , a submarine of the Royal Navy
 , a submarine of the United States Navy

Other uses 
 R12 (cemetery), a Neolithic cemetery in Sudan
 Dichlorodifluoromethane, a refrigerant
 Ndombe language
 R-12 Dvina, a Soviet ballistic missile
 R12: Extremely flammable, a risk phrase
 Small nucleolar RNA R12